Arpedium is a genus of beetles belonging to the family Staphylinidae.

The genus was first described by Erichson in 1839.

The species of this genus are found in Europe, Japan and Northern America.

Species:
 Arpedium quadrum (Gravenhorst, 1806)

References

Omaliinae
Staphylinidae genera